Salmon Creek is a census-designated place (CDP) in Clark County, Washington, United States. The population was 19,686 at the 2010 census, up from 16,767 at the 2000 census.

Geography
Salmon Creek is located in southwestern Clark County at  (45.704938, -122.661300). It is bordered to the northeast by Mount Vista, to the east by Barberton, to the southeast by Walnut Grove, to the south by Hazel Dell, to the southwest by Lake Shore, and to the west by Felida.

Demographics
As of the census of 2000, there were 16,767 people, 6,439 households, and 4,642 families residing in the CDP. The population density was 2,673.6 people per square mile (1,032.5/km2). There were 6,756 housing units at an average density of 1,077.3/sq mi (416.0/km2). The racial makeup of the CDP was 91.32% White, 1.26% African American, 0.54% Native American, 2.49% Asian, 0.14% Pacific Islander, 1.34% from other races, and 2.92% from two or more races. Hispanic or Latino of any race were 4.81% of the population. 18.0% were of German, 10.9% English, 10.9% Irish, 10.0% American and 6.3% Norwegian ancestry according to Census 2000.

There were 6,439 households, out of which 37.7% had children under the age of 18 living with them, 57.9% were married couples living together, 10.4% had a female householder with no husband present, and 27.9% were non-families. 22.3% of all households were made up of individuals, and 6.7% had someone living alone who was 65 years of age or older. The average household size was 2.60 and the average family size was 3.04.

In the CDP, the age distribution of the population shows 28.1% under the age of 18, 7.5% from 18 to 24, 28.4% from 25 to 44, 26.6% from 45 to 64, and 9.4% who were 65 years of age or older. The median age was 37 years. For every 100 females, there were 95.3 males. For every 100 females age 18 and over, there were 92.2 males.

The median income for a household in the CDP was $53,917, and the median income for a family was $62,989. Males had a median income of $48,766 versus $31,186 for females. The per capita income for the CDP was $23,673. About 6.6% of families and 8.4% of the population were below the poverty line, including 11.8% of those under age 18 and 3.5% of those age 65 or over.

References

External links
Salmon Creek Neighborhood Association

Census-designated places in Clark County, Washington
Census-designated places in Washington (state)
Portland metropolitan area